Rob Maas (born 17 December 1969) is a Dutch football manager and former player.

Playing career 
Maas was born in Eindhoven and made his debut in professional football in the 1989–90 Eerste Divisie season when playing for FC Eindhoven. He then moved to the Eredivisie with RKC Waalwijk. In 1993, Maas transferred to Feyenoord, winning two KNVB Cups in three seasons.

Subsequently, he moved to Germany's Bundesliga, playing for Arminia Bielefeld and then Hertha BSC. Although he did not receive a lot of playing time at Hertha, he helped the club win the DFB-Ligapokal two times during his time there. In 2003, Maas moved to the 2. Bundesliga club MSV Duisburg. After two seasons, he returned to the Netherlands, helping newly promoted Heracles Almelo avoid relegation and stay in the Eredivisie. He then had a second stint at RKC Waalwijk from July 2008 until June 2009, when he retired.

Managerial career 
Following the departure of Peter Bosz to Maccabi Tel Aviv on 4 January 2016, Maas, who had been Bosz's assistant, was appointed interim manager of Vitesse. On 8 May 2016, the final day of the 2015–16 season, it was announced he was relieved of his duties.

On 17 June 2016, Maas was appointed manager of SC Cambuur, replacing Marcel Keizer who had left the club after their relegation to the Eerste Divisie. Four months later, on 15 October 2016, Cambuur announced that they had sacked Maas, as the club was in fourteenth position after ten league games.

Honours 
Feyenoord
 KNVB Cup: 1993–94, 1994–95

Hertha BSC
 DFB-Ligapokal: 2001, 2002

References

External links
 

1969 births
Living people
Dutch footballers
Footballers from Eindhoven
FC Eindhoven players
Feyenoord players
RKC Waalwijk players
MSV Duisburg players
Hertha BSC players
Arminia Bielefeld players
Heracles Almelo players
Bundesliga players
2. Bundesliga players
Eredivisie players
Eerste Divisie players
Dutch expatriate footballers
Expatriate footballers in Germany
Dutch expatriate sportspeople in Germany
Dutch football managers
SBV Vitesse managers
SC Cambuur managers
Israeli Premier League managers
Association football midfielders